Santa Maria Natural Park is a protected area on Santa Maria Island in the Azores. The park was created by the Secretaria Regional do Ambiente e do Mar (Regional Secretariate for the Environment and Oceans), of the Autonomous Regional Government of the Azores to better manage the protected areas of Santa Maria Island. Several natural landscapes were preserved and their use conditioned in order to foster conservation and support endemic flora and fauna species, as well as provide communal forms of recreation and nature interpretation.

History
On the 7 November 2008, the Regional Government legislated the creation (under Regional Legislative Decree 47/2008/A) of the Parque Natural da Ilha de Santa Maria (Santa Maria Island Natural Park) in order to coordinate and administer the island's thirteen protected areas as one.

Geography

Nature Reserves
 [SMA01] Nature Reserve of the Formigas Islets
 [SMA02] Nature Reserve of the Vila Islet
Natural Monuments
 [SMA03] Natural Monument of Pedreira do Campo, Figueiral and Prainha
Protected Areas for the Management of Habitats and Coast Species
 [SMA04] Protected Area of the Southwest Coast
 [SMA05] Protected Area of Ponta do Castelo
 [SMA06] Protected Area of Baía do Cura
 [SMA07] Protected Area of Pico Alto
Protected Landscapes
 [SMA08] Protected Landscape of Barreiro da Faneca
 [SMA09] Protected Landscape of Baía de São Lourenço
 [SMA10] Protected Landscape of Baía da Maia
Protected Areas for the Management of Resources
 [SMA11] Protected Resource Areas of Baía de São Lourenço
 [SMA12] Protected Resource Areas of the North Coast
 [SMA13] Protected Resource Areas of the Southern Coast

In addition, the Direcção Regional dos Recursos Florestais (Regional Directorate for Forest Resources), which is responsible for the administration of forest resources and parks on the island, is responsible for the maintenance and promotion of the following forest reserves, within the designated spaces:

 Recreational Forest Reserve of Fontinhas
 Recreational Forest Reserve of Valverde
 Recreational Forest Reserve of Mata do Alto

References
Notes

Sources
 
 
 

Santa Maria
Ramsar sites in Portugal
Santa Maria Island